Sri Reddy Yerakala, professionally known as Sri Reddy, is an Indian actress who is well known in the Telugu film and television industry. She made her debut in 2011 with Nenu Naana Abaddam, and also appeared in Aravind 2 and Zindagi.

Career 
Sri Reddy began her career in Nenu Nanna Abaddam, directed by Govind Varha.

In 2013, she was the female protagonist in the thriller film Aravind 2, directed by Sekhar Suri. She will appear in the upcoming Telugu movie Zindagi, with Challa Sai Varun.

In August 2018, she mentioned that a biopic will be made on her life, titled Reddy Diary to be directed by Alauddin and featuring her.

2021 Climax movie she acted as a minor role against G B Rajendra prasad, Sasha Singh.

Controversies
Sri Reddy participated in a nude protest on the issue of sexual exploitation in Tollywood that she alleged to be happening on a large scale.  The film body Movie Artistes Association (MAA) banned Sri Reddy for the protest. Mumbai-based financier Apoorvaditya (Aaditya) Kulshrestha actively supported her protest. She claimed that she was assaulted at her residence in Valasaravakkam, Chennai, by financier Subramani and his assistant Gopi. She lodged a complaint against them with the police.

In response to MAA banning Reddy, Kulshrestha withdrew from his membership from the MAA. During a press conference, Kulshrestha asked the leading actors of the film industry to come out in support of women as they are portrayed fighting for women in the movies. The silence from the movie industry on the issue of the casting couch was also slammed by several actors. The National Human Rights Commission of India sent notices to the I&B Ministry of the Telangana government over Reddy's protest.

After the protests, MAA agreed to set up a Committee Against Sexual Harassment, and also revoked the ban on her.

References 

Living people
Actresses in Telugu cinema
Year of birth missing (living people)